Bryn is a district in the municipality of Bærum, Norway. Together with the district Hammerbakken, its population (2007) is 5,680.

References

Neighbourhoods in Bærum